Hitoyoshi is a 12th-century castle, now ruins, located in Hitoyoshi, Kumamoto Prefecture. It is recognized as one of Japan's top 100 castles.

History 

There was an original castle built on the site by Sagara Nagayori, in the late 1200s. After this, the clan used the castle as their home, up until the early 1400s. Sometime before 1470, another castle was built on the location. The Sagara clan pushed out to extend their power around the Kuma area, however they were defeated by the Shimazu clan at the Battle of Minamata in the year 1581. As a result, they lost much area under their control. Sagara Nagatsune carried out more extensive development of the castle in the year 1589. The Kumagawa River is used by the castle as both an outer defensive moat, and for trade via water transport. The castle was demolished, like many castles in Japan, in the Meiji era.

Current site 

Little of the castle remains today on site. The stone walls remain extant, with both a recently added yagura and gate.

Literature

References 

Former castles in Japan
1871 disestablishments in Japan
Castles in Kumamoto Prefecture
Sagara clan